The Cathedral Basilica of the National Shrine of Our Lady Aparecida is a prominent Roman Catholic basilica in Aparecida, Brazil. It is dedicated to Our Lady Aparecida as the principal Patroness of Brazil. Nossa Senhora Aparecida roughly translates to Our Lady Revealed. It is the largest cathedral and the second largest Catholic church in the world in interior area after the St. Peter's Basilica in the Vatican City.

History
The site has its origins in the finding of a statue of the Virgin Mary.
According to local tradition, three fishermen were attempting to catch a large amount of fish in the Paraíba River for a banquet honoring the visit of São Paulo Governor, Pedro de Almeida in 1717. Despite their prayers, their attempts were fruitless until late in the day, one of the fishermen cast his net and pulled it back to find the statue of the Virgin Mary. Upon his next cast, he found the head. The group cleaned the statue, wrapped it in cloth, and returned to their task to find their fortunes had changed and they were able to obtain all the fish they needed.  The statue is believed to be the work of Frei Agostino de Jesus, a monk residing in São Paulo.

The statue was originally housed at the home of Felipe Pedroso, one of the fisherman who found it. This became a popular site for visitors wishing to pray to the statue, leading Pedroso's family to build a small chapel to house the statue. This was replaced in 1734 by a larger chapel, and then in 1834 by the first basilica on the site. In 1955, with pilgrimage numbers still growing, the construction work began on the present building, in a site nearby. It has room for more than 200,000 people and is second in capacity after St. Peter's Basilica.

The old wooden chapel was originally built in 1745. The old shrine is a modest church in the colonial style built between 1834 and 1888. Since that time, pious worshippers have termed it as a basilica.

Due to the following conflicting accounts on dates, the Vatican has enumerated the following recorded Papal documents:

 Pope Leo XIII mentioned the Brazilian devotion to this image called "Nossa Senhora da Conceição Aparecida" prior to his death in 1903
 Pope Pius X granted a canonical coronation to this same image on 8 December 1904.
 Pope Pius XI declared that same Marian title as the Patroness of Brazil through a papal bull signed on 16 July 1930, also witnessed and signed by Cardinal Eugenio Pacelli.
 Pope Paul VI granted its first Golden rose on 12 August 1967
 Pope John Paul II elevated and consecrated formally as a Basilica on 4 July 1980.

New Basilica

Benedito Calixto Neto was the architect contracted for the design of the project and, in 1955, the construction of the new basilica started. The basilica contains  of space. The main church can accommodate 100,000 people, which can expand to in 100,000 during external celebrations. The grounds contain a shopping mall, medical clinic, restaurants and a  parking lot that can hold 4,000 buses and 6,000 cars.

On 4 July 1980, Pope John Paul II consecrated the sanctuary under the name Our Lady Aparecida while the building was still under construction.  The feast day for Our Lady Aparecida is 12 October.

Pope Benedict XVI visited the Basilica of the Shrine of Aparecida on 12 May 2007, during his Apostolic Journey to Brazil on the occasion of the Fifth General Conference of the Bishops of Latin America and the Caribbean.  During his visit, the Pope awarded the Shrine a Golden Rose.

On the occasion of World Youth Day, Pope Francis visited the basilica on 24 July 2013, celebrating mass there.

Main pilgrimage center for the Catholic Church in Brazil, the National Shrine of Aparecida was recognized by the Vatican as the Archdiocesan Cathedral of Aparecida on 12 November 2016, being since then an official Bishop church.

Construction site 

Also known as "Basílica Nova", it is built on the "Pitas" hill, had its earthwork started in 1952, and finished in 1954. It started to be built on 11 November 1955, by the North side, and went on to build the Brasília Tower, which had its metallic structure donated by the then president Juscelino Kubitschek.

After the tower was finished, the works went to the central dome, then, in mid-1972, to the "Capela das Velas" and to the South side, then passing to the West and East, and the intermediate wings.

There is a walkway, called "Passarela da Fé", which connects the old church and the new basilica to which it is 392 m long, where there are people in a sign of faith, who walk this stretch on their knees.

Honors

Golden Rose 
The Basilica of Aparecida has received the "Golden Rose" on three occasions:

 The first, from Pope Paul VI in 1967, on the occasion of the 250th anniversary jubilee of the appearance of the image of Our Lady Aparecida, with the delivery made on 15 August of that year.
 The second was blessed by Pope Benedict XVI, on 18 March 2007,  Domingo Lætare , and delivered on 12 May of the same year, on the occasion of his visit to Brazil.
 The third was given by Pope Francis, on 9 October 2017, for the 300th anniversary of the appearance of the image.

Infrastructure 

The National Sanctuary has a wide and complete network of infrastructure to receive many people during regular days and festivities.

Lost and found 
The lost objects are forwarded to the Pastoral Secretariat or to the Information Center, where they can be claimed with prior consultation. As for people who get lost from their companions or groups, there is the Meeting Point, which has trained staff and a sound system. However, the Shrine guides people towards organizing themselves at the family or pilgrimage level and adopting the Meeting Point as a common reference; it also guides towards visits with children and the elderly: identify them with a card containing a contact phone and information that may be relevant.

Accessibility 
The National Sanctuary has access ramps to the temple and the basement, elevators for the visit to the Tower of Brasília viewpoint, rubberized and non-slip floors and ramps, 58 parking spaces for the elderly and people with disabilities, the bathrooms have an independent entrance for companions of people with disabilities, 45 special chairs, handrails at two heights.

Medical clinic 
On the east side of the Basilica, next to the Passarela, there is an ambulatory for emergency or urgent assistance, it is a free service and has doctors, nurses and attendants.

Pilgrim support center 
Popularly known as "Shoppinho", it was designed to provide convenience, leisure and welcome. It has a large food court with several types of restaurants, 380 stores in 36,000m2, kiosks, baby changing facilities, bank tellers, drinking fountains, aquarium, meeting point and amusement park.

Parking 
The Sanctuary has a parking lot with capacity for 2000 buses and 3000 private cars, and has mechanical assistance and insurance against theft or theft of vehicles, but is not responsible for belongings left in the vehicle.

Baby station 
To favor mothers and fathers with young children, the Basilica offers two baby facilities. One of them is underground and contains 10 cribs and 16 changing tables and serves about 300 children a day. The other is located in the Support Center, on the south wing, and has microwaves, hygienic showers, changing tables, bottle warmers and other free services.

Property security 
In order to provide a peaceful and safe visit, the Sanctuary has about 200 security agents. 400 military police, on average, reinforce in special seasons. With a modern camera system, 48 fixed and eight mobile equipment, with 24-hour monitoring, internal and external, they observe the Basilica. Also vehicles and motorcycles that make daytime rounds, inside the walls of the National Shrine, collaborate with the surveillance.

Utilities 
In the basement of the Basilica, there is the "Sala das Promessas", the baby station, bathrooms, free drinking water, "Salão dos Romeiros" (dining area) and booking of masses. At the Brasília Tower, the viewpoint (100m high), the "Nossa Senhora Aparecida Museum" and the information center. At the Support Center, the meeting point and information center. In the external sector, there is the Chapel of Baptisms, the Press Room, the drivers' room, property security and the ambulatory.

Men's Rosary (Terço dos Homens) Annual Pilgrimage
Every year, in February, thousands of men from Brazil who engage in the Men's Rosary (Portuguese: Terço dos Homens) movement gather at the basilica to pray and attend Mass. They are guided by the Archbishop of Juiz de Fora (Minas Gerais), Gil Antônio Moreira, who heads the movement according to the Brazilian Episcopal Conference (CNBB). Nationwide, the movement has two million worshippers.

See also

 List of largest church buildings in the world 
 List of tallest domes
 Roman Catholic Marian churches

References

External links
Official website (in Portuguese)

Our Lady Aparecida
Our Lady Aparecida
Roman Catholic churches in São Paulo (state)
Religious buildings and structures in São Paulo (state)
Roman Catholic shrines in Brazil
1717 establishments in South America
Roman Catholic churches completed in 1980
20th-century Roman Catholic church buildings in Brazil
Church buildings with domes